The Phoenix Memo is a letter sent to FBI headquarters on July 10, 2001 by FBI Special Agent Kenneth Williams, recommending the assembling of a worldwide listing of civil aviation schools. Williams, then stationed in Phoenix, Arizona, was investigating students at some of these schools for possible terrorist links.

Content
According to Williams, the purpose of the memo was to

advise the Bureau and New York of the possibility of a coordinated effort by Osama Bin Laden to send students to the United States to attend civil aviation universities and colleges. Phoenix has observed an inordinate number of individuals of investigative interest who are attending or who have attended civil aviation universities and colleges in the State of Arizona.

The recommendations outlined by Williams were ignored or put aside because of other concerns. The memo was seen by at least one dozen officials of the FBI, including John P. O'Neill, but it was never passed to acting director Thomas J. Pickard, his successor Robert Mueller or the Central Intelligence Agency. In addition, the existence of the memo was not made known to President George W. Bush and his senior national security staff until May 2002. 

Mueller told the US Congress in an emotional hearing in May 2002 that failure to act on the memo was the result of deficits in the FBI’s analytical capabilities.

Coleen Rowley (2002) 
The memo became the subject of another communiqué in June 2002, when FBI Agent Coleen Rowley took advantage of the federal Whistleblower Protection Act provisions to inform FBI Director Robert Mueller that his public statements about lack of “advance knowledge” by the bureau had no basis in fact. In her memo, Rowley wrote about the alleged suppression of the investigation concerning Zacarias Moussaoui.

Analysis 
Bill Gertz of The Washington Times suggested that the lack of attention to the memo was one of several intelligence failures leading to the September 11 attacks.

See also 
Bin Ladin Determined To Strike in US, August 6, 2001
Capture of Zacarias Moussaoui, August 16, 2001
Khalid al-Mihdhar
Nawaf al-Hazmi
Risk aversion

References

Further reading 

September 11 attacks
Memoranda
Classified documents
2001 documents
Federal Bureau of Investigation